Liquid oxygen—abbreviated LOx, LOX or Lox in the aerospace, submarine and gas industries—is the liquid form of molecular oxygen. It was used as the oxidizer in the first liquid-fueled rocket invented in 1926 by Robert H. Goddard, an application which has continued to the present.

Physical properties
Liquid oxygen has a pale blue color and is strongly paramagnetic: it can be suspended between the poles of a powerful horseshoe magnet. Liquid oxygen has an expansion ratio of 1:861 and because of this, it is used in some commercial and military aircraft as a transportable source of breathing oxygen.

Because of its cryogenic nature, liquid oxygen can cause the materials it touches to become extremely brittle. Liquid oxygen is also a very powerful oxidizing agent: organic materials will burn rapidly and energetically in liquid oxygen. Further, if soaked in liquid oxygen, some materials such as coal briquettes, carbon black, etc., can detonate unpredictably from sources of ignition such as flames, sparks or impact from light blows. Petrochemicals, including asphalt, often exhibit this behavior.

The tetraoxygen molecule (O4) was first predicted in 1924 by Gilbert N. Lewis, who proposed it to explain why liquid oxygen defied Curie's law. Modern computer simulations indicate that, although there are no stable O4 molecules in liquid oxygen, O2 molecules do tend to associate in pairs with antiparallel spins, forming transient O4 units.

Liquid nitrogen has a lower boiling point at −196 °C (77 K) than oxygen's −183 °C (90 K), and vessels containing liquid nitrogen can condense oxygen from air: when most of the nitrogen has evaporated from such a vessel, there is a risk that liquid oxygen remaining can react violently with organic material. Conversely, liquid nitrogen or liquid air can be oxygen-enriched by letting it stand in open air; atmospheric oxygen dissolves in it, while nitrogen evaporates preferentially.

The surface tension of liquid oxygen at its normal pressure boiling point is 13.2 dyn/cm.

Uses

In commerce, liquid oxygen is classified as an industrial gas and is widely used for industrial and medical purposes. Liquid oxygen is obtained from the oxygen found naturally in air by fractional distillation in a cryogenic air separation plant.

Air forces have long recognized the strategic importance of liquid oxygen, both as an oxidizer and as a supply of gaseous oxygen for breathing in hospitals and high-altitude aircraft flights. In 1985, the USAF started a program of building its own oxygen-generation facilities at all major consumption bases.

In rocket propellant 

Liquid oxygen is the most common cryogenic liquid oxidizer propellant for spacecraft rocket applications, usually in combination with liquid hydrogen, kerosene or methane.

Liquid oxygen was used in the first liquid fueled rocket. The World War II  V-2 missile also used liquid oxygen under the name A-Stoff and Sauerstoff. In the 1950s, during the Cold War both the United States' Redstone and Atlas rockets, and the Soviet R-7 Semyorka used liquid oxygen. Later, in the 1960s and 1970s, the ascent stages of the Apollo Saturn rockets, and the Space Shuttle main engines used liquid oxygen.

In 2020, many rockets used liquid oxygen: 
 Chinese space program: Long March 5, and its derivations Long March 6, Long March 7
 Indian Space Research Organisation: GSLV
 JAXA (Japan): H-IIA and H3 (under development)
 Roscosmos (Russia): Soyuz-2 and Angara (under development)
 ESA (EU): Ariane 5 and Ariane 6 (under development)
 Korea Aerospace Research Institute (South Korea): KSLV-1 and KSLV-II 
 United States
 United Launch Alliance: Atlas V, Delta IV, Delta IV Heavy, Vulcan (under development)
 Northrop Grumman: Antares 230+
 Blue Origin: New Shepard and New Glenn (under development)
 Rocket Lab: Electron
 Firefly Aerospace: Firefly Alpha
 Virgin Orbit: LauncherOne

History
By 1845, Michael Faraday had managed to liquefy most gases then known to exist. Six gases, however, resisted every attempt at liquefaction and were known at the time as "permanent gases". They were oxygen, hydrogen, nitrogen, carbon monoxide, methane, and nitric oxide.
In 1877, Louis Paul Cailletet in France and Raoul Pictet in Switzerland succeeded in producing the first droplets of liquid air.
In 1883, Polish professors Zygmunt Wróblewski and Karol Olszewski produced the first measurable quantity of liquid oxygen.

See also

 Oxygen storage
 Industrial gas
 Cryogenics
 Liquid hydrogen
 Liquid helium
 Liquid nitrogen
 List of Stoffs
 Natterer compressor
 Rocket fuel
 Solid oxygen
 Tetraoxygen

References

Rocket oxidizers
Cryogenics
Oxygen
Industrial gases
Liquids
1883 in science